Karl Krolow (11 March 1915 – 21 June 1999) was a German poet and translator. In 1956 he was awarded the Georg Büchner Prize. He was born in Hanover, Germany, and died in Darmstadt, Germany.

Biography
Krolow came from a family of civil servants, and grew up in Hanover where he attended grammar school. From 1935 to 1942 he studied Germanic and Romance languages, philosophy and art history at the universities of Göttingen and Breslau. Krolow, who had been a member of the Hitler Youth from 1934, joined the NSDAP in 1937. From 1940. Krolow began having poems published in Nazi propaganda journals such as the Krakauer Zeitung. From 1942 he was working as a freelance writer based in Göttingen. In 1943/44, he published in the Nazi weekly journal Das Reich.

Krolow moved to Hanover in 1952, and in 1956 to Darmstadt, where he lived working as an independent writer until his death. From the 1950s, Krolow was considered one of the greatest poets of the postwar German literature. He was also a translator from French and Spanish, and author of works of prose. From 1951, he was a member of the PEN Center of the Federal Republic of Germany, from 1953 a member of the Deutsche Akademie für Sprache und Dichtung in Darmstadt (temporarily as president), from 1960 a member of the Akademie der Wissenschaften und der Literatur in Mainz, and from 1962, a member of the Bayerische Akademie der Schönen Künste. For his extensive and varied work he has received numerous awards, including 1956 Georg Büchner Prize, the 1965 Great Lower Saxony Art Award, 1975, the Goethe-Plakette des Landes Hessen, the Grand Order of Merit of the Federal Republic of Germany, the literature prize Stadtschreiber von Bergen and Rainer Maria Rilke Prize for Poetry in 1976, an honorary doctorate from the Technische Universität Darmstadt, in 1983 the Hessischer Kulturpreis (Hessian Culture Prize), in 1985 the Großer Literaturpreis der Bayerischen Akademie der Schönen Künste and in 1988 the Friedrich-Hölderlin-Preis of Bad Homburg.

Works 

 Hochgelobtes gutes Leben, Hamburg 1943 (with Hermann Gaupp)
 Das Gedicht in unserer Zeit, Hanover 1946
 Gedichte, Konstanz 1948
 Heimsuchung, Berlin 1948
 Auf Erden, Hamburg 1949
 Die Zeichen der Welt, Stuttgart 1952
 Von nahen und fernen Dingen, Stuttgart 1953
 Wind und Zeit, Stuttgart 1954
 Tage und Nächte, Düsseldorf  1956
 Fremde Körper, Berlin  1959
 Schatten eines Mannes, Wamel am Möhnesee 1959 (with )
 Tessin, München 1959 (with Fritz Eschen)
 Aspekte zeitgenössischer deutscher Lyrik, Gütersloh 1961
 Ausgewählte Gedichte, Frankfurt 1962
 Die Rolle des Autors im experimentellen Gedicht, Wiesbaden 1962
 Unsichtbare Hände, Frankfurt 1962
 Corrida de toros, Darmstadt 1964 (with Helmut Lander)
 Darmstadt – Abglanz einer Residenz, Darmstadt 1964 (with Annelise Reichmann)
 Reise durch die Nacht, Darmstadt 1964
 Schattengefecht, Frankfurt 1964
 Gedicht für Darmstadt, Darmstadt 1965
 Gesammelte Gedichte, Frankfurt
 Laudatio auf Fritz Usinger, Passau 1965
 Landschaften für mich, Frankfurt 1966
 Poetisches Tagebuch, Frankfurt 1966
 Das Problem des langen und kurzen Gedichts heute, Mainz 1966
 Unter uns Lesern, Darmstadt 1967
 Alltägliche Gedichte, Frankfurt 1968
 Minuten-Aufzeichnungen, Frankfurt 1968
 Flug über Heide, Moor und grüne Berge, Braunschweig 1969
 Bürgerliche Gedichte, Hamburg 1970 (unter the pen name Karol Kröpcke)
 Nichts weiter als Leben, Frankfurt 1970
 Die Träume der Ilse Aichinger, Dortmund 1971
 Deutschland deine Niedersachsen, Hamburg 1972
 Zeitvergehen, Frankfurt 1972
 Zu des Rheins gestreckten Hügeln, Troisdorf 1972
 Ein Gedicht entsteht, Frankfurt 1973
 Ein Lesebuch, Frankfurt 1975
 Bremen color, Bremen 1976 (with Jochen Mönch)
 Der Einfachheit halber, Frankfurt 1977
 Von literarischer Unschuld, Darmstadt 1977
 Düsseldorf, Köln 1978
 Das andere Leben, Frankfurt 1979
 Gedichte, Frankfurt 1980
 Prolog für Darmstadt, Darmstadt 1980
 Herbstsonett mit Hegel, Frankfurt 1981
 Im Gehen, Frankfurt 1981
 Nocturnos, Hofheim 1981 (with Eberhard Schlotter)
 Pomologische Gedichte, Usingen 1981
 Glanz aus dem Glas, Usingen 1982
 Zwischen Null und Unendlich, Frankfurt 1982
 Erinnerte Ansichten, Darmstadt 1983 (with )
 Herodot oder Der Beginn von Geschichte, Waldbrunn 1983
 Melanie, München 1983
 Schönen Dank und vorüber, Frankfurt 1984
 Gedichte und poetologische Texte, Stuttgart 1985
 Nacht-Leben oder Geschonte Kindheit, Frankfurt 1985
 Unumwunden, Schondorf 1985
 Notizen, Erinnerungen, Träume, Darmstadt 1985 (with Edith Wolf and Helmut Lander)
 Darmstadt, Hanau 1986
 Gedichte zu Radierungen von Thomas Duttenhoefer, Isernhagen/Hanover 1986
 Lebensalter, Dreieich 1986 (with )
 Die andere Seite der Welt, Pfaffenweiler 1987
 In Kupfer gestochen, Frankfurt 1987
 Karl Krolow, Berlin 1987
 Als es soweit war, Frankfurt 1988
 Meine Gedichte, Frankfurt 1990
 Sätze in die Nacht, Aachen 1990
 Wenn die Schwermut Fortschritte macht, Leipzig 1990
 Ich höre mich sagen, Frankfurt 1992
 Etwas brennt, Frankfurt 1994
 Die zweite Zeit, Frankfurt 1995
 Menschlich, New York 1996 (with Vera B. Profit)
 Gedichte, die von Liebe reden, Frankfurt 1997
 Die Handvoll Sand, Frankfurt 2001
 Im Diesseits verschwinden, Frankfurt 2002
 Genug ist nie genug. with A woodcut by Alfred Pohl. Passau 1997

References

Bibliography 
 Heinz Ludwig Arnold (ed.), Karl Krolow (Text+Kritik, no. 77), Verlag Text + Kritik, Munich 1983, .
 Fausto Cercignani, "Dunkel, Grün und Paradies. Karl Krolows lyrische Anfänge in «Hochgelobtes gutes Leben»", Germanisch-Romanische Monatsschrift, 36/1, 1986, 59–78.
 Fausto Cercignani, "Zwischen irdischem Nichts und machtlosem Himmel. Karl Krolows Gedichte 1948: Enttäuschung und Verwirrung", Literaturwissenschaftliches Jahrbuch, 27, 1986, 197–217.
 Horst S. Daemmrich, Messer und Himmelsleiter. Eine Einführung in das Werk Karl Krolows, Verlag Groos, Heidelberg 1980.
 Neil H. Donahue, Karl Krolow and the poetics of amnesia in postwar Germany, Rochester, New York, 2002
 Walter H. Fritz (ed.), Über Karl Krolow. Suhrkamp, Frankfurt am Main 1972.
 Rolf Paulus, Der Lyriker Karl Krolow. Biographie und Weiterentwicklung, Gedichtinterpretation, Bibliographie, Bouvier, Bonn 1983, 
 Artur Rümmler, Die Entwicklung der Metaphorik in der Lyrik Karl Krolows (1942–1962). Die Beziehung zu deutschen, französischen und spanischen Lyrikern, Lang, Frankfurt am Main 1972.

External links

Karl Krolow Suhrkamp Verlag 

1915 births
1999 deaths
German Hispanists
Spanish–German translators
Commanders Crosses of the Order of Merit of the Federal Republic of Germany
Georg Büchner Prize winners
Writers from Hanover
Writers from Darmstadt
20th-century translators
20th-century German poets
German male poets
Members of the German Academy for Language and Literature
20th-century German male writers
Hitler Youth members
Nazi Party members